Mircea Bogdan (born 5 June 1982) is a retired Romanian long-distance runner who specialized in the 3000 metres steeplechase.

As a junior he won the silver medal at the 2001 European Junior Championships and finished seventh at the 2001 Summer Universiade. He placed lowly at the 2001 World Cross Country Championships, and competed at the 2000 World Junior Championships and the 2003 European U23 Championships without reaching the final. Studying in the United States, he won the NCAA Division I Championships of 2005, representing UTEP.

As a senior he competed in the 3000 metres at the 2007 European Indoor Championships, the steeplechase at the 2007 World Championships and in the 1500 metres at the 2008 World Indoor Championships without reaching the final. He became Romanian champion three times. His personal best steeplechase time was 8:23.12 minutes, achieved in April 2007 in Palo Alto.

References

1982 births
Living people
Romanian male steeplechase runners
World Athletics Championships athletes for Romania
Romanian expatriates in the United States
UTEP Miners athletes